C. malayanus may refer to:
 Carrhotus malayanus, a spider species
 Cyrtodactylus malayanus, a gecko species

See also
 Malayanus